Hope Is Just a State of Mind is the third studio album by Newcastle band Little Comets. The album was released via The Smallest Label on 16 February 2015. It includes the singles "Little Italy", "Salt" and "Don't Fool Yourself".

Track listing

Personnel
 Robert Coles - Lead Vocals & Guitar
 Michael Coles - Lead Guitar
 Matthew 'the cat' Hall - Bass

Charts

References

Little Comets albums
2015 albums